Menegoz is a surname. Notable people with the surname include:

Eugène Ménégoz (1838–1921), French theologian
Margaret Ménégoz (born 1941), Hungarian-born German-French film producer
Mathias Menegoz (born 1968), French writer of Hungarian origin